Rajmachi Fort (Killa) is one of the many historical forts in the rugged hills of Sahyadri mountains (Western Ghats). It consists of two twin fortresses Shriwardhan and Manaranjan, with a wide machi (plateau) surrounding the two Balekillas. Udhewadi is a small village of about 60 households (as per 2011 census report) situated on the machi, at the southern foot of Manaranjan Balekilla of Rajmachi Fort.

History 
The fort played a strategic role in the First Anglo-Maratha War.

Rajmachi Fort has been declared as a protected monument.

Trekking to Rajmachi 
There are two approaches to Fort Rajmachi,
(a) from Lonavala  and 
(b) from Kondivde or Kondhane village in Karjat Taluka of Raigad District.
Lonavala – Rajmachi distance is 15 km and it is almost a plain walk, though there are a few ups and downs on this path. It takes about three and a half hour to cover the distance on foot.
From Kondivde or Kondhane village, it is a steep climb up to Rajmachi. An experienced trekker takes about two and a half hour to climb up on this route.
In case a Trekkers’ Group is not familiar with the Trek Route, they should hire a local Route Guide
During the dry season after rains, i.e. from November to May, a strong and sturdy utility vehicle like Tata Sumo, Mahindra Bolero, Qualis, etc. can be taken right up to Udhewdi (Fort Rajmachi). The route is via Khandala, Kune village, Della Adventure Resort, Patel Dam, Phanasrai and Jambhali Phata. The initial section of this route up to Della Adventure Resort is a good road, The further portion of this route is a very rough track and therefore not fit for driving ordinary passenger cars like Maruti 800, Wagon R, Indica, Swift, etc.
Sturdy utility vehicle like Tata Sumo can be hired at Lonavla or Khandala for reaching Rajmachi Fort.

Rajamchi Fort is an easy trek, there are vehicles who leave you till the base village and from there you have to walk around 6 Km, which take around 2 hours depending on the speed. Best part about the Rajmachi trek is for the bike riders as the road are muddy and best for the off riding. There are also beautiful waterfalls on the way.

See also 
Shrivardhan Fort

Kataldhar Lonavla Waterfall

References 

Lonavala-Khandala
Villages in Pune district
Buildings and structures in Lonavala-Khandala
Forts in Pune district